The Tarocco Siciliano is a tarot deck found in Sicily and is used to play Sicilian tarocchi. It is one of the three traditional Latin-suited tarot decks still used for games in Italy, the others being the more prevalent Tarocco Piemontese and the Tarocco Bolognese. The deck was heavily influenced by the Tarocco Bolognese and the Minchiate. It is also the only surviving tarot deck to use the Portuguese variation of the Latin suits of cups, coins, swords, and clubs which died out in the late 19th and early 20th centuries.

Design
Tarot decks were produced in Palermo before 1630. The deck was shortened from 78 cards during the 18th century. The Tarocco Siciliano currently uses 63 cards, one more than the Tarocco Bolognese. Despite this, the pack is sold with one unneeded card, the 1 of Coins, which was used to bear the stamp tax (the only game that uses this 64th card is the four-handed version played in Barcellona Pozzo di Gotto where it ranks as the lowest in the suit of Coins). The pip cards contain ranks 5 to 10 with the Coins also having a 4. Like modern French tarot, but unlike all other tarot games, the pip cards of all suits rank in progressive order.

Unlike the northern Piemontese and Bolognese tarocchi decks which use Italian suits of smooth batons and curved swords, the Siciliano uses Spanish pips of knobbly cudgels and straight swords like other southern Italian decks. The Siciliano depicts these suits like the extinct Portuguese pattern by the intersecting of the swords and clubs. The Minchiate as well as the extinct decks of the Papal States and the Kingdom of Naples had the same feature.

This deck is known for its distinctly female knaves (donne) that are sometimes referred to as maids.  While some decks in southern Italy sometimes include female or androgynous knaves, the Tarocco Siciliano knaves are unambiguously and consistently women.  This was a feature found in the Portuguese pattern.  Since a Latin tarot deck also includes queens, this is the only traditional playing card deck to include two ranks of women to have survived into the present. The Minchiate deck had half of its knaves female while the Cary-Yale tarot set had three ranks of women per suit.

Some portraits of the trumps borrow from the Minchiate while others are unique or altered, such as the Hanged Man who is now hanged by his neck instead of by his foot. All trumps use corner indices with modern Arabic numerals from 1 to 20 with the exception of Miseria, which ranks below trump 1. Miseria, depicted by a chained beggar, is not considered a valuable card. The face cards and the Fugitive (the Fool) are unnumbered and unlabelled. Unlike other tarot games, the Fugitive cannot lead a trick unless it is the last trick. The deck is single-faced and not reversible. Pip cards use centered indices in common with Portuguese-suited decks.

Players do not use the names of trumps 2 to 15, they refer to them by number. Of these cards, only the names of trumps 4, 14, and 15 are known through historical sources, the rest have been lost. The order of trumps from highest to lowest is as follows:

Trumps 1, 20, and the Fool are worth 10 points. Trumps 16 to 19 and kings are worth 5 points. Queens, knights, and maids are worth 4, 3, and 2 respectively. The five highest trumps are collectively known as the arie (airs) just like in the Minchiate.

Tarot decks are often just expanded versions of local standard decks but this deck is not related to the standard 40-card Sicilian pack which has a separate origin. Their cards are not interchangeable.

References

External links
 Sicilian Tarocchi Association
 Rules for Sicilian Tarocchi games at pagat.com

Tarot playing card decks
Playing cards